Justina Morales (February 19, 1987 – December 31, 1995) was an American girl from the Bedford-Stuyvesant section of Brooklyn, New York, who was killed at the age of eight years by her mother's boyfriend, Luis Santiago, on New Year's Eve in 1995. Her body was never found.  The killing gained notoriety primarily through the New York City newspapers.

Disappearance
Justina's disappearance had gone unnoticed for more than a year. Teachers and school officials failed to take note of her long absence. In February 1997, a relative informed the police that the girl had been missing and possibly had been killed. The subsequent investigation, similar to those in the deaths of Elisa Izquierdo and Nadine Lockwood about the same time, disclosed shortcomings of the New York City child-welfare system.

1997 trial
In 1997, the trial of Santiago revealed that he had abused the girl physically for several years and that he had beaten her to death when she had refused to take a bath for a party that night. Justina's mother, Denise Solero, who was Santiago's girlfriend, had likewise been abused by him. Several news reports and editorials portrayed Solero as a victim who was terrified to inform anyone that her daughter had been killed, while other accounts depicted her as an accomplice to the crime who had displayed a depraved indifference toward her daughter's plight. Two years after the killing, Santiago was sentenced to a minimum of six and a maximum of nineteen years in prison. Solero had agreed to testify against Santiago in exchange for probation. It was reported in 1999 that Solero wanted to be reunited with another daughter. It was reported that Solero had changed her name to "Forbes" and was seeking supervised visits with her then two-year-old daughter, Sierra. Brooklyn Supreme Court Justice Joseph Bruno said there was no chance for a mother-daughter 
reunion that year, saying: "At this point, I see no basis to allow her to visit with any child, particularly her own child". Bruno further said: "It may be disappointing, but it should not be a surprise that this is my position."

Comparison to Nixzmary Brown 
A January 2008 article by Andrea Peyser in The New York Post compared Justina to Nixzmary Brown, whose murder trial began the same month.

See also

 List of murder convictions without a body
 List of solved missing person cases
 Murder of Joseph Wallace

References

External links 
Morales at Find A Grave

1987 births
1990s missing person cases
1995 deaths
1995 murders in the United States
American people of Puerto Rican descent
People from Bedford–Stuyvesant, Brooklyn
Child abuse resulting in death
Deaths by beating in the United States
Deaths by person in New York City
Incidents of violence against girls
Murdered American children
Missing person cases in New York City
Murder convictions without a body